A. C. Jones House is a historic home located at Batesburg-Leesville, Lexington County, South Carolina. It was built in 1904, and is a California bungalow form influenced weatherboard residence. The hipped roof has three large, hipped dormers.  The dormers, roof, and projecting wraparound porch have exposed rafters. The house and porch sit on a granite foundation.

It was listed on the National Register of Historic Places in 1982.

References

Houses on the National Register of Historic Places in South Carolina
Bungalow architecture in South Carolina
Houses completed in 1904
Houses in Lexington County, South Carolina
National Register of Historic Places in Lexington County, South Carolina